China Economic Information Network (中国经济信息网) is a national information network that provides information and analyses of Chinese national macroeconomic trends. It is sponsored by the State Information Network. It was officially opened on December 3, 1996.

External links
Official website (in Chinese)
China Monitor, CEInet's official international entity (in English)

Communications in China
Economy of China